A by-election for the constituency of Edinburgh East in the United Kingdom House of Commons was held on 3 October 1945, caused by the ennoblement of the incumbent Labour MP Frederick Pethick-Lawrence. The result was a hold for the Labour Party, with their candidate George Thomson.

Result

Previous election

References

 Craig, F. W. S. (1983) [1969]. British parliamentary election results 1918-1949 (3rd edition ed.). Chichester: Parliamentary Research Services. . 
 
 A Guide to Post-War Scottish By-elections to the UK Parliament

East, 1945
1945 in Scotland
1940s elections in Scotland
1945 elections in the United Kingdom
1940s in Edinburgh